This is a list of notable people associated with Marshall, Texas.
 

This list is incomplete.

 Phillip Baldwin, jurist
 Mike Barber, football player, evangelist
 John Burke, lawyer, soldier, and spy
 Robert Campbell (artist), a painter, poet, and publisher
 Edward Clark, Texas Governor
 Mike Clark, NFL placekicker
 Kathleen Neal Cleaver, Black Panther Party member
 George Dawson, author
 Floyd Dixon, R&B pianist
 Mathew Ector, jurist and legislator
 James Farmer, founder of CORE, organized freedom rides
 James L. Farmer, Sr., first Black Texan to hold a doctorate
 George Foreman, athlete and entrepreneur
 Joseph C. Goulden, best-selling author and political reporter
 Brea Grant, actress
 Ben Z. Grant, playwright, Texas legislator, state judge 
 Homer Hailey, Church of Christ preacher and author, born in Marshall in 1903
 Sam B. Hall, Jr., former congressman and federal jurist 
 Alexander Hawthorn, lawyer, minister, and C.S. Army general
 James Pinckney Henderson, first governor of Texas
 Susan Howard, actress, writer, activist 
 Alphonso Jackson, 13th U.S. Secretary of Housing and Urban Development, appointed by President George W. Bush
 Walter P. Lane, Confederate General
 Ken Lattimore, member of the Western singing group Sons of the Pioneers (1998-current).
 Opal Lee, Activist promoting the Juneteenth federal holiday
 Fred T. Long, Wiley College football coach and athletic director
 Robert W. Loughery, journalist, publisher, and diplomat
 Ashley C. McKinley, aviator; explorer
 Blanche L. McSmith, Alaska state representative, activist, and businesswoman
 Leo Michelson, painter and sculptor
 John T. Mills, Supreme Court Justice of the Republic of Texas
 Johnny Moss, champion poker player
 Bill Moyers, journalist and government official
 Pendleton Murrah, Texas Governor
 Lucy Holcombe Pickens, 19th-century Southern socialite
 William Henry Pope, politician, self-described "Jim Crow Senator"
 Horace Randal, Confederate brigadier general
 Wendy Russell Reves, fashion model, philanthropist
 Henry Roquemore, 20th-century actor
 Max Sandlin, former congressman and House Minority Whip
 I. B. Scott, Methodist Episcopal cleric, newspaper editor, and educator
 Franklin Barlow Sexton, Confederate Congressman
 Terrance Shaw, NFL cornerback
 Kendrick Starling, NFL wide receiver
 James Harper Starr, politician
 Y. A. Tittle, football Hall of Famer
 Melvin B. Tolson, author, poet, and politician
 Isaac Van Zandt, statesman of both Republic and State of Texas
 James Wheaton, actor
 Peter Whetstone, pioneer leader, city father
 Louis T. Wigfall, U.S. Senator, later Confederate Senator
 Kevin Williams, NFL running back
 Romeo M. Williams, prominent civil rights attorney who played a pivotal role in the desegregation of Marshall, Texas.; also a U.S. Army Air Force officer and trained fighter pilot with the Tuskegee Airmen
 Bob Young, football player

<--This list is alphabetical, please make sure new additions are in the correct place.-->

References

Marshall, Texas
Marshall